Gearing may refer to:

Engineering
Gear ratio
Mechanical advantage
Gear train, an arrangement of gears

Military
Gearing family, whose members served in the US Navy
USS Gearing (DD-710), a destroyer of the US Navy
Gearing-class destroyer, a group of destroyers in the US Navy

Other uses
Leverage (finance), also known as gearing
Ashley Gearing (born 1991), country music singer

See also
Gear (disambiguation)